Nicholas Nathan Leckey (born March 12, 1982) is a former American football center who played in the National Football League. He was drafted by the Arizona Cardinals in the sixth round of the 2004 NFL Draft. He played college football at Kansas State University.

Leckey played for the New Orleans Saints, St. Louis Rams and the Arizona Cardinals.

Early years
Leckey attended Grapevine High School in Grapevine, Texas and was a letterwinner in football and wrestling. In football, he was a three-year starter. In wrestling, he won the State Championship as a senior. Leckey graduated from Grapevine High School in 2000.

College career
Leckey played college football at Kansas State University where during his career, he did not allow a sack. He majored in hotel/restaurant management.  He began his career at guard before switching to center.  He started 41 consecutive games.  He earned first-team All-America honors from ESPN and Sports Illustrated as a senior.  Also earned consensus All-Big 12 first-team choice and named Kansas State's Offensive Lineman of the Year.

He was a finalist for the Rimington Trophy, which eventually went to Jake Grove of Virginia Tech.

Professional career

Arizona Cardinals
Leckey was selected by the Arizona Cardinals in the sixth round (167th overall) in the 2004 NFL Draft. He made his NFL debut at the St. Louis Rams on September 12. During his time at the Cardinals, he played in 44 games making 20 starts.

St. Louis Rams
Leckey was signed by the St. Louis Rams as a free agent on June 6, 2007. He played in three games for the team in 2007 and started all 10 games in which he appeared in 2008.

New Orleans Saints
Leckey signed a one-year contract with the New Orleans Saints as an unrestricted free agent on March 17, 2009. He was waived on September 26 to make room for Chase Daniel who was signed off the practice squad. He was re-signed by the Saints on September 29. He played in eight regular season games and all three postseason games in 2009, mostly on special teams with some work at center. He was re-signed on March 7, 2010. He was released on September 4, 2010.

Personal life
Leckey is married to Erin Kathleen Leckey.  After retiring from football, he returned to Kansas State and received his degree in hotel and restaurant management in December 2012.

References

External links
Arizona Cardinals bio
Kansas State Wildcats bio
New Orleans Saints bio
St. Louis Rams bio

1982 births
Living people
Players of American football from Dallas
American football offensive guards
American football centers
Kansas State Wildcats football players
Arizona Cardinals players
St. Louis Rams players
New Orleans Saints players
People from Grapevine, Texas